Ames is an unincorporated community in San Miguel County, Colorado, United States.  Ames is the site of the world's first system to generate and transmit alternating current electricity for industrial purposes (mining), the Ames Hydroelectric Generating Plant.

See also

 Ames Hydroelectric Generating Plant

References

External links

Unincorporated communities in San Miguel County, Colorado
Unincorporated communities in Colorado